Mystacoleucus obtusirostris is a species of ray-finned fish, found in freshwater habitats in Southeast Asia, notably in Thailand in the Mekong River, Chao Phraya River, and Mae Klong River. It is exploited in subsistence fishing.

References

External links 
 Fishbase entry

Fish of Thailand
Fish described in 1842